Kaneez is a 1949 Indian Hindi-language drama film, directed and produced by Krishan Kumar, starring Shyam, Munawar Sultana and Kuldip Kaur in lead roles.

Plot 
Sabira is the daughter of a wealthy man, Akbar, who is cheated by his manager, Hamid, and forced into a mental home. Sabira marries Hamid's son, Akhtar, but the marriage is destroyed by a woman called Darling, who is after Akhtar for his money. Sabira is forced to become a servant in her own house, but she recovers her place as the mistress as Darling is exposed and Akhtar realized her worth for him.

Cast 
 Munawwar Sultana as Sabira, Akbar's daughter
 Shyam as Akhtar, Hamid's son
 Urmila Devi as Hamida 
 Kuldip Kaur as Miss Darling
 Jillo as Sakira 
 Khwaja Sabir as Hamid Ul Hasan, Akbar's manager
 Shyama as Suraiya
 S.K. Prem as Anwar
 Ramesh Sinha as Seth Akbar
 Bibi as Sakira 
 Nazir Kashmiri as Family Doctor
 Baby Anwari as Young Hamida
 Baby Urmila as Young Sabira
 Master Naresh as Young Akhtar

Music 
The music was composed by the two very well known composers then, Ghulam Haider and Hansraj Behl with a large playback of Shamshad Begum, Mohammad Rafi, Surinder Kaur, Geeta Dutt, Zeenat Begum, G. M. Durrani, S. D. Batish and Rajkumari Dubey. The lyrics were written by Hasrat Lucknavi, Sarshar Sailani, Shahir Ghaznavi and Harishchandra Akhtar. O.P. Nayyar composed the background music.

See also 
Shama

References

External links 

1949 films
1940s Hindi-language films
Indian black-and-white films
Indian drama films
1949 drama films
Hindi-language drama films